Octavia the Younger (c. 66 BC – 11 BC) was the elder sister of the first Roman Emperor, Augustus (known also as Octavian), the half-sister of Octavia the Elder, and the fourth wife of Mark Antony. She was also the great-grandmother of the Emperor Caligula and Empress Agrippina the Younger, maternal grandmother of the Emperor Claudius, and paternal great-grandmother and maternal great-great-grandmother of the Emperor Nero.

One of the most prominent women in Roman history, Octavia was respected and admired by contemporaries for her loyalty, nobility and humanity, as well as for maintaining traditional Roman feminine virtues.

Life

Childhood
Octavia was born around 66 BC. Full sister to Augustus, Octavia was the only daughter born of Gaius Octavius' second marriage to Atia, niece of Julius Caesar. Octavia was born in Nola, present-day Italy; her father, a Roman governor and senator, died in 59 BC from natural causes. Her mother later remarried, to the consul Lucius Marcius Philippus. Octavia spent much of her childhood travelling with her parents. Marcius was in charge of educating Octavia and her brother Octavian, later known as Augustus.

First marriage
Some time before 54 BC, her stepfather arranged for her to marry Gaius Claudius Marcellus. Marcellus was a man of consular rank, a man who was considered worthy of her and was consul in 50 BC. He was also a member of the influential Claudian family and descended from Marcus Claudius Marcellus, a famous general in the Second Punic War. In 54 BC, Octavia's great-uncle Julius Caesar is said to have been anxious for her to divorce her husband so that she could marry Pompey, who had just lost his wife Julia (Caesar's daughter, and thus Octavia's cousin once removed). The couple did not want to get a divorce, so instead Pompey declined the proposal and married Cornelia Metella. Thus, Octavia's husband continued to oppose Julius Caesar, including in the crucial year of his consulship, 50 BC. Civil war broke out when Caesar invaded Italy from Gaul in 49 BC.

Marcellus, a friend of Cicero, was an initial opponent of Julius Caesar when Caesar invaded Italy, but did not take up arms against his wife's great uncle at the Battle of Pharsalus, and was eventually pardoned by him. In 47 BC he was able to intercede with Caesar for his cousin and namesake, also a former consul, then living in exile. Presumably, Octavia continued to live with her husband from the time of their marriage (she would have been between 12 and 15 when they married) to her husband's death. They had three surviving children: Claudia Marcella Major, Claudia Marcella Minor and Marcus Claudius Marcellus. All three were born in Italy. Although according to the anonymous Περὶ τοῦ καισαρείου γένους Octavia bore Marcellus four sons and four daughters. Her husband Marcellus died in May 40 BC.

Second marriage

By a Senatorial decree, Octavia married Mark Antony in October 40 BC, as his fourth wife (his third wife Fulvia having died shortly before). This marriage had to be approved by the Senate, as she was pregnant with her first husband's child, and was a politically motivated attempt to cement the uneasy alliance between her brother Octavian and Mark Antony; however, Octavia does appear to have been a loyal and faithful wife to Antony. Between 40  and 36 BC, she travelled with Antony to various provinces and lived with him in his Athenian mansion. There she raised her children by Marcellus as well as Antony's two sons; Antyllus and Iullus, as well as the two daughters of her marriage to Antony, Antonia Major and Antonia Minor who were born there.

Breakdown
The alliance was severely tested by Antony's abandonment of Octavia and their children in favor of his former lover Queen Cleopatra VII of Egypt (Antony and Cleopatra had met in 41 BC, an interaction that resulted in Cleopatra bearing twins, Alexander Helios, a boy, and Cleopatra Selene, a girl). After 36 BC, Octavia returned to Rome with the daughters of her second marriage. On several occasions she acted as a political advisor and negotiator between her husband and brother. For example, in the spring of 37 BC, while pregnant with her daughter Antonia Minor, she was considered essential to an arms deal held at Tarentum, in which Antony and Augustus agreed to aid each other in their Parthian and Sicilian campaigns. She had won over her brother's advisers Agrippa and Maecenas and convinced him to renew their aliance. She was hailed as a "marvel of womankind." In 35 BC, after Antony suffered a disastrous campaign in Parthia, she brought fresh troops, provisions, and funds to Athens. There Antony had left a letter for her, instructing her to go no further. Mark Antony divorced Octavia in late 33 BC. In 33, Antony sent men to eject her from his house in Rome. She became sole caretaker of their children, except for Antyllus who was already with his father in the East. After Antony's suicide in 30 BC, her brother executed Antyllus but allowed Octavia to raise Antony's younger son Iullus by Fulvia as well as his children by Cleopatra (the two sons Alexander Helios and Ptolemy Philadelphus, and one daughter, Cleopatra Selene II).

Later life

In 35 BC, Augustus accorded a number of honours and privileges to Octavia, and Augustus' wife Livia, previously unheard of for women in Rome. They were granted sacrosanctitas, meaning it was illegal to verbally insult them. Previously, this had been only granted to tribunes. Livia and Octavia were made immune from tutela, the male guardianship which all women in Rome except for the Vestal Virgins were required to have. This meant they could freely manage their own finances. Finally, they were the first women in Rome to have statues and portraits displayed en masse in public places. Previously, only one woman, Cornelia, mother of the Gracchi, had been part of the public statues displayed in Rome. In Augustus' rebuilding of Rome as a city of marble, Octavia was featured. In all her representations she wore the "nodus" hairstyle, which at the time was considered conservative and dignified, and worn by women from many classes.

Augustus adored, but never adopted, her son Marcellus. When Marcellus died of illness in 23 BC unexpectedly, Augustus was thunderstruck, Octavia disconsolate almost beyond recovery.

Aelius Donatus, in his Life of Vergil, states that Virgil

recited three whole books [of his Aeneid] for Augustus: the second, fourth, and sixth—this last out of his well-known affection for Octavia, who (being present at the recitation) is said to have fainted at the lines about her son, "… You shall be Marcellus" [Aen. 6.884]. Revived only with difficulty, she sent Virgil ten thousand sesterces for each of the verses."

She may have never fully recovered from the death of her son and retired from public life, except on important occasions. The major source that Octavia never recovered is Seneca (De Consolatione ad Marciam, II.) but Seneca may wish to show off his rhetorical skill with hyperbole, rather than adhere to fact. Some  dispute Seneca's version, as Octavia publicly opened the Library of Marcellus, dedicated in his memory, while her brother completed the Marcellus's theatre in his honor. Undoubtedly Octavia attended both ceremonies, as well as the Ara Pacis ceremony to welcome her brother's return in 13BC from the provinces. She was also consulted in regard to, and in some versions advised, that Augustus's daughter Julia marry Agrippa after her mourning for Marcellus ended. Agrippa had to divorce Octavia's daughter Claudia Marcella Major in order to marry Julia, so Augustus wanted Octavia's endorsement very much.

Death

Octavia died of natural causes. Suetonius says she died in Augustus' 54th year, thus 11 BC with Roman inclusive counting.  Her funeral was a public one, with her sons-in-law (Drusus, Ahenobarbus, Iullus Antony, and possibly Paullus Aemillius Lepidus) carrying her to the grave in the Mausoleum of Augustus. Drusus delivered one funeral oration from the rostra and Augustus gave her the highest posthumous honors (building the Gate of Octavia and Porticus Octaviae in her memory). Augustus also had the Roman senate declare his sister to be a goddess. Augustus declined some other honors decreed to her by the senate, for reasons unknown. She was one of the first Roman women to have coins minted bearing her image; only Antony's previous wife Fulvia pre-empted her.

Issue
Children with Marcellus
Octavia and her first husband had one son and two daughters who survived to adulthood.

 Marcus Claudius Marcellus
 Claudia Marcella Major
 Claudia Marcella Minor

Children with Mark Antony
Octavia and Mark Antony had two surviving daughters by their marriage (her second, his fourth), and both were the ancestors of later Roman emperors.

 Antonia Major: grandmother to Emperor Nero.
 Antonia Minor: mother to Emperor Claudius, grandmother to Emperor Caligula, and great-grandmother to Emperor Nero.

Descendants
Three Roman emperors, Caligula, Claudius and Nero, were amongst the most famous of her descendants. 

Octavia the Younger
Marcus Claudius Marcellus (42 BC – 23 BC), no issue
Claudia Marcella Major (born 41 BC)
Vipsania Marcella Major
Vipsania Marcella Minor
Iullus Antonius (? – ?), issue unknown
Lucius Antonius (20 BC – AD 25), issue unknown
Iulla Antonia (? – ?), issue unknown
Claudia Marcella Minor (born 40 BC)
 Paullus Aemilius Regulus (? – ?), issue unknown
 Claudia Pulchra (14 BC–26)
 Marcus Valerius Messala Barbatus (11 BC – 20/21)
 Marcus Valerius Messalla Corvinus (? – ?), possibly son of Aurelius Messalinus
 Valeria Messalina (17 AD or 20 AD – 48 AD)
 Claudia Octavia (39 AD or 40 AD  – 62 AD), no issue
 Tiberius Claudius Caesar Britannicus (41 AD  – 55 AD), no issue
 Valeria Messallia (c. 10 BC – ?)
 Lucius Vipstanus Poplicola (c. 10 – after 59)
 Gaius Valerius Poplicola (? – ?), issue unknown
 Gaius Vipstanus Messalla Gallus (c. 10 BC – after 60)
 Lucius Vipstanus Messalla (c. 45 – c. 80)
 Lucius Vipstanus Messalla (c. 75 – after 115), according to some authors, this man may be one of Saint Melania's ancestors.
 Antonia Major (39 BC – before 25 AD)
 Domitia Lepida the Elder (c. 19 BC – 59 AD)
 Quintus Haterius Antoninus (? – ?)
 Gnaeus Domitius Ahenobarbus (17 BC – 40 AD)
  Nero Claudius Caesar Augustus Germanicus (Lucius Domitius Ahenobarbus) (37 AD  – 68 AD)
 Claudia Augusta (January 63 AD – April 63 AD), died young
 Domitia Lepida the Younger (10 BC – 54 AD)
 Marcus Valerius Messalla Corvinus (same man as above), possibly son of Aurelius Messalinus or Valerius Barbatus (same man as above)
 Valeria Messalina (same woman as above)
 See her line above
 Faustus Cornelius Sulla Felix (22 AD – 62 AD)
 A son, died young
 Antonia Minor (36 BC – 37 AD)
 Germanicus Julius Caesar (15 BC – 19 AD)
 Nero Julius Caesar Germanicus (6 AD – 30 AD), no issue
 Drusus Julius Caesar Germanicus (8 AD – 33 AD), no issue
 Tiberius Julius Caesar Germanicus (born between 7 and 12 AD), died as an infant
 Ignotus (born between 7 and 12 AD), died as an infant
 Gaius Julius Caesar Germanicus Major (born between 7 and 12 AD), died in childhood
  Gaius Julius Caesar Augustus Germanicus (Caligula) (12 AD – 41 AD)
 Julia Drusilla (39 AD – 41 AD), died young
 Julia Agrippina (Agrippina Minor) (15 AD – 59)
   Nero Claudius Caesar Augustus Germanicus (Lucius Domitius Ahenobarbus) (same man as above)
  See his line above
 Julia Drusilla (16 AD – 38 AD), no issue
 Julia Livilla (18 AD – 42 AD), no issue
 Claudia Livia Julia (Livilla) (13 BC – 31 AD)
 Julia Livia (7 AD – 43 AD)
 Gaius Rubellius Plautus (33 AD – 62 AD), had several children
 Gaius Rubellius Blandus (? – ?), issue unknown
 Rubellius Drusus (? – ?), issue unknown
 Tiberius Julius Caesar Nero Gemellus (19AD  – 37 AD or 38 AD), no issue
 Tiberius Claudius Caesar Germanicus II Gemellus (19 AD – 23 AD), died young
  Tiberius Claudius Caesar Augustus Germanicus (10 BC – 54 AD)
 Tiberius Claudius Drusus, died young
 Claudia Antonia (c. 30 AD – 66 AD)
  A son (same individual as above)
 Claudia Octavia (same woman as above)
 Tiberius Claudius Caesar Britannicus (same man as above)

Cultural depictions
A famous anecdote, recorded in the late fourth-century vita of Virgil by Aelius Donatus, in which the poet read the passage in Book VI in praise of Octavia's late son Marcellus and Octavia fainted with grief, has inspired several works of art. The most famous example is Jean-Auguste-Dominique Ingres's 1812 painting Virgil reading The Aeneid before Augustus, Livia and Octavia but other artists, including Jean-Joseph Taillasson, Antonio Zucchi, Jean-Baptiste Wicar, Jean-Bruno Gassies and Angelica Kaufmann, have also been inspired to depict this scene.

Octavia's later life, around the time of the death of Marcellus, is depicted in the 1976 television adaptation of Robert Graves's novel I, Claudius. The role was played by Angela Morant, and should not be confused with her great-granddaughter Claudia Octavia (also referred to as "Octavia" in the series), Claudius's daughter and wife of the future emperor Nero, who was played by Cheryl Johnson.

In the 1963 film Cleopatra, she is played by Jean Marsh in an uncredited role.

A highly fictionalized version of Octavia's early life is depicted in the 2005 television series Rome, in which Octavia of the Julii (Kerry Condon) seduces and sleeps with her younger brother, Gaius Octavian, has a lesbian affair with Servilia of the Junii (the series' version of Servilia) and a romantic relationship with Marcus Agrippa (based on the historical Marcus Vipsanius Agrippa), none of which has any historical basis.

In the TV series Domina (2021), Octavia was played by Alexandra Moloney and Claire Forlani.

Notes

References

Sources

Further reading
Life and virtues
 Details on Octavia pt 1 "Octavian was much attached to his sister, and she possessed all the charms, accomplishments and virtues likely to fascinate the affections and secure a lasting influence over the mind of a husband. Her beauty was universally allowed to be superior to that of Cleopatra and her virtue was such as to excite even admiration in an age of growing licentiousness and corruption."
 Details on Octavia pt 2
 Nuttall Encyclopedia profile says merely that she was "distinguished for her beauty and her virtue"

Discussion
 Octavia's birth and life discussed briefly
 Octavia's marriage discussed briefly

Family and descendants
 Marcellus, Octavia's only son who died aged 20
 Julia, Octavia's daughter-in-law and niece

Print sources
Cluett, Ronald. “Roman women and triumviral politics, 43-37 B.C.” Echos du monde classique. Classical views 17, no. 1 (1998), 67–84.
Erhart, K. P. “A new portrait type of Octavia Minor (?).” The J. Paul Getty Museum journal 8 (1980), 117–28.
Fischer. Fulvia und Octavia: die beiden Ehefrauen des Marcus Antonius in den politischen Kämpfen der Umbruchszeit zwischen Republik und Principat. Berlin: Logos-Verl., 1999.
Foubert, Lien. “Vesta and Julio-Claudian women in imperial propaganda.” Ancient society 45 (2015), 187–204.
Freisenbruch, Annelise. 2010. The First ladies of Rome: the women behind the Caesars. London: Jonathan Cape.

External links

 Octavia Minor on livius.org

 Octavia entry in historical sourcebook by Mahlon H. Smith

 
60s BC births
11 BC deaths
1st-century BC Roman women
1st-century BC Romans
Octavii Rufi
Family of Augustus
Julio-Claudian dynasty
Wives of Mark Antony